Sandringham Sabres is a NBL1 South club based in Melbourne, Victoria. The club fields a team in both the Men's and Women's NBL1 South. The club is a division of Southern Basketball Association (SBA), the major administrative basketball organisation in the Sandringham region. The Sabres play their home games at Sandringham Family Leisure Centre.

Club history
Southern Basketball Association (SBA) was founded in 1974 and was located in Waltham Street, Sandringham. The association later moved to Tulip Street, Cheltenham.

In 2000, the SBA entered a team into both the Big V State Championship Men's division (SCM) and Women's division (SCW). Between 2001 and 2008, the Sandringham men made a grand final appearance every year, winning championships in 2002 and 2005. The women on the other hand made grand final appearances in 2003, 2005 and 2006, winning their first championship in their third try.

In 2009, both teams were elevated from the Big V into the South East Australian Basketball League (SEABL).

In 2019, following the demise of the SEABL, the Sabres joined the NBL1 South. The NBL1 South season did not go ahead in 2020 due to the COVID-19 pandemic.

References

External links
SBA's official website

Big V teams
South East Australian Basketball League teams
Basketball teams in Melbourne
Basketball teams established in 2000
2000 establishments in Australia
Sport in the City of Bayside
Cheltenham, Victoria